Shadrach Pryce was a Welsh Anglican priest and educationalist in the last part of the 19th century and the first decade of the 20th.

Pryce was born in Dolgellau, Merionethshire the son of Hugh Price (1793-1851), a draper, and educated at Queens' College, Cambridge. Ordained in 1863, he began his career as a teacher at Dolgelly Grammar School after which he was  Rector of Yspytty then Vicar of Llanfihangel Aberbythych. During this time he was also the Government Educational Inspector for Breconshire and Carmarthenshire (1867–1894).

Later he was Archdeacon of Carmarthen (1896–1899) and Examining Chaplain to John Owen, Bishop of St David’s. From 1899 to 1910 he was Dean of St Asaph.

He died on 17 September 1914. He had married Margaret Ellen Davies and had two sons and seven daughters. His son Lewis became Archdeacon of Wrexham  and his daughter Myfanwy Pryce was a published novelist. His brother was Dean of Bangor.

References

1841 births
People from Dolgellau
People educated at College Merion-Dwyfor
Alumni of Queens' College, Cambridge
Welsh educational theorists
Archdeacons of Carmarthen
Deans of St Asaph
1914 deaths